African Champion Industries, previously called Super Paper Products Co. Ltd., is a Ghana and manufacturing company involved in the production of toilet paper.
They are listed on the stock index of the Ghana Stock Exchange, the GSE All-Share Index. The company was established on May 23, 1967.

References

Manufacturing companies established in 1967
Companies listed on the Ghana Stock Exchange
Manufacturing companies of Ghana
1967 establishments in Ghana
Tema